Essential Energy is a state-owned electricity infrastructure company which owns, maintains and operates the electrical distribution networks for much of  New South Wales, covering 95 percent of the state geography. It also owns the reticulated water network in Broken Hill through Essential Water, formerly Australian Inland Energy and Water.

Essential Energy was formed from the previously state-owned energy business, Country Energy, when the retail division of the company, along with the Country Energy brand, was sold by the NSW Government in 2011 to Origin Energy.

See also

 Stephens Creek Dam

References

External links 
 Essential Energy
 Essential Energy Network Map

Government-owned companies of New South Wales
Electric power distribution network operators in Australia
Australian companies established in 2011
Government-owned energy companies
Energy companies established in 2011